The Coal River is a river of Fiordland, New Zealand. It rises south of Stephens Peak and flows south-westward into the Tasman Sea, draining Lakes Beattie, Swan and Paradise.

See also
List of rivers of New Zealand

References

Land Information New Zealand - Search for Place Names

Rivers of Fiordland